Thaddeus Jones may refer to:

Tad Jones (1952–2007), American music historian and researcher
Thaddeus Jones (politician), American politician and mayor of Calumet City, Illinois